Jessica Kate Brooks (born 28 May 1981 in Ealing, London) is an English actress. In musical theatre, she is a soprano. She has appeared in various BBC television productions, including Murder Rooms: The Kingdom of Bones, and featured in episodes of Footballer's Wives.

Brooks is known for her role as Ghanima Atreides in the 2003 Sci-Fi Channel mini-series, Children of Dune.  She is also a trained voice-over artist, and has studied classics at Oxford University. In 2003, she co-starred in her first feature film, Collusion.

Brooks has appeared in an episode of the long-running British TV show, Casualty (series 21, episode 11 "All Through The Night") as police officer, Nikki Soames. She has also appeared in an episode of Midsomer Murders titled "Four Funerals and a Wedding".

In 2008, she played the role of Lisa Houseman in the stage version of Dirty Dancing.

Filmography

References

External links
 

Living people
People from Ealing
English television actresses
1981 births